The National Orthopaedic Hospital, Igbobi, Lagos (NOHIL), is a hospital in Lagos, Nigeria.

History
The National Orthopaedic Hospital, Igbobi, Lagos commenced operations as a rehabilitation centre for wounded soldiers during World War II in 1943, after which it developed to a hospital  under the British Colonial Medical services  of Colonial Nigeria in 6 December 1945. The hospital, initially named the Royal Orthopaedic Hospital in 1956 was also instrumental in treating wounded soldiers and civilians of the Nigerian Civil war of 1967-1970. The hospital was handed over to the Lagos State Government in 1975 and subsequently the Federal Government in 1979.

Healthcare
The hospital has a staff strength of about 1300. It has an intensive care unit and a 450-bed capacity. The hospital is now reputed to be the largest orthopaedic hospital in West Africa. Mobolaji Bank Anthony funded a new section of the hospital which included the rehabilitation of the emergency ward.

The hospital has the following under listed departments to cater for patients needs

References

External links

Hospitals established in 1945
Hospitals in Lagos
1945 establishments in Nigeria